Foreigners out! Schlingensiefs Container (Ausländer raus! Schlingensiefs Container), alternately named "Wien-Aktion", "Please Love Austria—First European Coalition Week", or "Foreigners Out—Artists against Human Rights", is an art project and television show from 2000 that took place within the scope of the annual Wiener Festwochen. It was created by Christoph Schlingensief and directed by Paul Poet. Realising public xenophobia and the new hate politics in the most drastic ways possible, he installed a container camp on a square in the middle of Vienna. The film and performance was made in a style that imitated the show Big Brother. It critically aimed both at certain forms of television entertainment and at a latent xenophobia still thriving in the whole world. It created a heated week, capturing the European right-wing drift and exposing dormant and open xenophobia for the world to see.

Political implications
The show was produced in Austria, and broadcast from the container set installed in Vienna. Shortly before Schlingensief came up with this project, the Freedom Party of Austria, under the leadership of Jörg Haider had been elected into the National Council of Austria and formed part of the new government.

Concept
The basis of the show was that a dozen or so real life asylum seekers lived inside containers. However, instead of being voted out of the show, the candidates were to be voted out of the country. Creating and utilizing such a situation of living in a strictly confined area, not knowing what would happen next, was to remind the audience of Nazi concentration camps, pointing at and making artistic use of existing parallels between the Nazi camps and television formats like Big Brother.

Methodology
Installing TV programs and other projects as mockeries of well-known existing formats is part of Schlingensief's methodology. In another show broadcast in Germany, Freakstars 3000, he set up a talent cast show where all candidates were mentally handicapped. In the theatre project Quiz 3000 (the '3000' was a recurring trademark of Schlingensief), he mocked the show Who wants to be a millionaire?, using questions like "Please sort the following concentration camps from north to south".

Awards
 Images Festival Toronto: Best International Film made on Video
 International Film Festival Rotterdam: Official Selection 2003
 Mar del Plata Film Festival: Official Competition A 2003

References
Kirsten Weiss: Recycling the Image of the Public Sphere in Art. "thresholds" magazine, Journal #23: "deviant".

Foreigners out! Schlingensiefs Container (2002) on Ubuweb

Austrian television series
2000 Austrian television series debuts
2000 Austrian television series endings
2000s Austrian television series
German-language television shows